Khan Shamsur Rahman, also known as Khan Mohammad Shamsur Rahman, was a Bangladeshi diplomat and the first ambassador of Bangladesh to the Soviet Union. He was the High Commissioner of Bangladesh to India.

Career 
Rahman came first in the Central Superior Services examinations of 1951.

In the 1960s, Rahman was stationed in the Pakistan Embassy in Indonesia. 

Rahman was an accused in the Agartala Conspiracy Case in 1968 that accused a number of Bengalis of working with India for the succession of East Pakistan. His defence lawyer was his older brother Ataur Rahman Khan who was the former Chief Minister of East Pakistan. He was one of three civil service officers charged in the Agartala case.

After the Independence of Bangladesh in 1971, Rahman was appointed by Sheikh Mujibur Rahman as the first ambassador of Bangladesh to the Soviet Union. On 10 January 1972, he received Prime Minister Sheikh Mujibur Rahman at the airport when he returned to Independent Bangladesh from prison in Pakistan. He served from 17 February 1972 to 4 August 1975 and was replaced by Shamsul Hoq. Rahman was posted High Commissioner of Bangladesh to India. He presented his credentials to President of India Fakhruddin Ali Ahmed on 1 August.

Death 
Rahman died in October 2010. He was 84 at the time of his death.

References 

2010 deaths
High Commissioners of Bangladesh to India
Ambassadors of Bangladesh to the Soviet Union
People from Dhaka District